Elizabethtown, Elizabeth Town, or similar may refer to:

Places
Elizabeth Town, Tasmania, Australia
Brockville, Ontario, Canada; formerly named Elizabethtown
Erzsébetváros or Elizabethtown, the 7th district of Budapest, Hungary

United States
Elizabethtown, California
Elizabethtown, Illinois
Elizabethtown, Bartholomew County, Indiana
Elizabethtown, Delaware County, Indiana
Elizabethtown, Kentucky, inspired a film (see below)
Elizabethtown, New York
Elizabethtown (CDP), New York, in Essex County, NY
Elizabethtown, Herkimer County, New York
Elizabeth, New Jersey, formerly named Elizabethtown
Elizabethtown, New Mexico
Elizabethtown, North Carolina
Elizabethtown, Ohio
Elizabethtown, Guernsey County, Ohio
Elizabethtown, Pennsylvania
Elizabethtown College
Elizabethtown (Amtrak station)
Elizabethton, Tennessee, which is pronounced and spelled -ton rather than -town
Elizabethtown, Texas
Moundsville, West Virginia, formerly named Elizabethtown

Other uses
Elizabeth Towne (1865–1960), New Thought writer and The Nautilus magazine editor
Elizabethtown (film), a 2005 film starring Orlando Bloom and Kirsten Dunst
Elizabethtown (soundtrack), the soundtrack for the film

See also
Elizabeth (disambiguation)